Charles Thom (born 24 January 1999), also known as Charles Thomu, is a Malawian professional footballer who plays as a goalkeeper for the Malawian club Silver Strikers, and the Malawi national team.

Career
Thom began his senior career with Silver Strikers on 13 March 2019, signing a professional contract with the club for 3 years.

International career
Thom was part of the Malawi squad the 2021 Africa Cup of Nations. He debuted with Malawi in the tournament in a 0–0 tie with Senegal on 18 January 2022, where he was named the man of the match.

References

External links
 
 Charles Thom at SoccerMalawi.com
 
 
 
 

1999 births
Living people
Malawian footballers
Malawi international footballers
Association football goalkeepers
2021 Africa Cup of Nations players